The Parent Trap franchise consists of American family-comedies, including the original theatrical film, three made-for-television sequel movies, and a theatrical legacy sequel/soft-remake. Based on the 1949 novel Lisa and Lottie (published in the United Kingdom and Australia since 2014 as The Parent Trap) by Erich Kästner, the plot centers around identical twin sisters, who were separated at birth and rediscover each other while attending summer camp. The pair trade places upon returning home, and devise a plan to bring their family back together.

The original 1961 film received positive critical response, and was deemed a success. Starting in 1986 three television sequels were produced and released as a part of The Magical World of Disney series. The 1998 film, received critical acclaim and was a hit for the studio financially.

The franchise will continue, with a streaming exclusive reboot in development to be released on Disney+.

Origin 

The 1949 German fictional children's picture book by Erich Kästner originally published as Das Doppelte Lottchen (The Double Lottie), was originally written during WWII as the plot for a movie. In 1942, Kästner was allowed by Nazi officials to develop the project under the working title of "The Great Secret", before the authorities eventually forbade his continued work. After the resolution of the war, the author redeveloped the story into the successful novel that was released.

The plot follows Lisa Palfy and Lottie Horn (Luise Palfy and Lottie Körner in the current British translation), two identical twins who were separated in infancy when their parents divorced while each raised by one half of the respective couple. The unsuspecting sisters meet at a summer camp where they engineer a plan to switch places when they return home. Though their behavior differs greatly, the parents do not suspect that the daughters had switched places. Upon realization the family reunites and at the behest of the daughters, the couple gets back together.

The book was adapted into various releases, including Walt Disney's adaptation. The novel was discovered by Disney's story editor Bill Dover who recommended the studio purchase the film rights. Production commenced in July 1960 under the working title of "We Belong Together", and went until September of the same year.

Films

The Parent Trap (1961)

Two identical twin sisters, Sharon McKendrick and Susan Evers, who were separated at birth due to their parents' divorce are unintentionally reunited years later at summer camp. Together, they devise a plan to bring their parents back together and reconcile their family. Sharon and Susan, one of which has lived with their mother and the other with their father, switch places after camp with intentions being to sway their parents into falling in love once more. Their attempts are problematically opposed by their father's gold-digging fiancé. The girls double their efforts in bringing their parents together.

The Parent Trap II (1986)

Years after the first film, Sharon finds herself living the life of a divorced, single mother. While at summer school, her 11-year-old daughter Nikki befriends a girl named Mary. The pair work together as matchmakers to persuade Sharon into dating Mary's widowed father, named Bill. The young friends work to convince their parents that they should be dating. As Sharon plans to move to New York, Susan is brought into the plan in order to help the single parents realize they love each other.

Parent Trap III (1989)

Upon returning from their respective summer vacations, triplets Megan, Lisa, and Jessie Wyatt discover that their father Jeffrey is engaged to a snobbish Cassie McGuire. When Cassie makes the unpopular decision to remodel the family's beach house in California, Susan Evers is hired to redecorate. Susan, who is now divorced, finds fulfillment in her work. As the triplets collectively decide that Susan is the right woman for their father, they develop a plan to bring the pair together. When their scheme doesn't seem to be working, they turn to Susan's twin sister, Sharon McKendrick-Grand for assistance. With the wedding quickly approaching, the women set out to prevent Jeffrey from marrying the wrong woman.

Parent Trap: Hawaiian Honeymoon (1989)

Newlywed couple Jeffrey and Susan Wyatt inherit a family resort in Hawai'i from his late-aunt. Together, the couple, his teenaged triplets, and Susan's twin sister Sharon, move to the island to repair its run-down condition and restore the vacationing location so that they can run an operating business. Despite their attempts, the project proves to be more than its worth, so Jeffrey and Susan decide to sell the property once it is reinstated. As the triplets encounter experiences with the boys they meet at the beach, Jeffrey comes into contact with an old high school rival named Ray. Ray bargains to purchase the property, with a promise of keeping the resort as-is. It soon comes to light that Ray has ulterior motives, which may not only include the land.

The Parent Trap (1998)

American-raised Hallie Parker and British-raised Annie James are twin sisters, who were separated at birth. By happenstance, the two attend the same summer camp and meet as complete strangers. Born to divorced parents Nick and Elizabeth, the preteen girls were raised on opposite sides of the Atlantic Ocean. After overcoming their differences and becoming close friends, the pair create a plan to swap places when they go home, giving each of them the chance to spend time with the parent that they have not had an opportunity to build a relationship with. The twins soon decide that they want to get the family back together, and come up with ideas for reuniting their parents.

Untitled reboot (TBA)

In November 2019, it was announced that a reboot is in development. The project will be released via streaming, as a Disney+ exclusive.

Main cast and characters
{| class="wikitable" style="text-align:center; width:99%;"
|-
! rowspan="2" | Character
! colspan="6" style="text-align:center;"| Film
|-
! style="text-align:center;"| The Parent Trap 
! style="text-align:center;"| The Parent Trap II
! style="text-align:center;"| Parent Trap III
! style="text-align:center;"| Parent Trap:  
! style="text-align:center;"| The Parent Trap 
! style="text-align:center;"| Untitled reboot
|-
! style="background-color:#ccccff;" colspan="7"| 
|-
! scope="row" | Sharon McKendrick-Grand
| rowspan="2" colspan="4"| Hayley Mills
| colspan="2" style="background:lightgrey;"|  
|-
! scope="row" | Susan Evers-Wyatt
| colspan="2" style="background:lightgrey;"|  
|-
! scope="row" | Margaret "Maggie" McKendrick
| Maureen O'Hara
| colspan="5" style="background:lightgrey;"|  
|-
! scope="row" | Mitchel "Mitch" Evers
| Brian Keith
| colspan="5" style="background:lightgrey;"|  
|-
! scope="row" | William "Bill" Grand
| style="background:lightgrey;"|  
| Tom Skerritt
| colspan="4" style="background:lightgrey;"|  
|-
! scope="row" | Nicole "Nikki" Ferris
| style="background:lightgrey;"|  
| Carrie Kei Heim
| colspan="4" style="background:lightgrey;"|  
|-
! scope="row" | Mary Grand
| style="background:lightgrey;"|  
| Bridgette Andersen
| colspan="4" style="background:lightgrey;"|  
|-
! scope="row" | Lisa Wyatt
| colspan="2" style="background:lightgrey;"|  
| colspan="2"| Leanna Creel
| colspan="2" style="background:lightgrey;"|  
|-
! scope="row" | Jessie Wyatt
| colspan="2" style="background:lightgrey;"|  
| colspan="2"| Monica Lacy
| colspan="2" style="background:lightgrey;"|  
|-
! scope="row" | Megan Wyatt
| colspan="2" style="background:lightgrey;"|  
| colspan="2"| Joy Creel
| colspan="2" style="background:lightgrey;"|  
|-
! scope="row" | Hallie Parker
| colspan="4" style="background:lightgrey;"|  
| rowspan="2"| Lindsay Lohan
| style="background:lightgrey;"|  
|-
! scope="row" | Annie James
| colspan="4" style="background:lightgrey;"|  
| style="background:lightgrey;"|  
|-
! scope="row" | Nicholas "Nick" Parker
| colspan="4" style="background:lightgrey;"|  
| Dennis Quaid
| style="background:lightgrey;"|  
|-
! scope="row" | Elizabeth "Liz" James
| colspan="4" style="background:lightgrey;"|  
| Natasha Richardson
| style="background:lightgrey;"|  
|-
! style="background-color:#ccccff;" colspan="7"| 
|-
! scope="row" | Vicky "Vicki" Robinson-Blake
| Joanna Barnes
| colspan="3" style="background:lightgrey;"|  
| Joanna Barnes
| style="background:lightgrey;"|  
|-
! scope="row" | Cassie McGuire
| colspan="2" style="background:lightgrey;"|  
| Patricia Richardson
| colspan="3" style="background:lightgrey;"|  
|-
! scope="row" | Nick
| colspan="2" style="background:lightgrey;"|  
| Ray Baker
| colspan="3" style="background:lightgrey;"|  
|-
! scope="row" | Ray
| colspan="3" style="background:lightgrey;"|  
| John M. Jackson
| colspan="3" style="background:lightgrey;"|  
|-
! scope="row" | Charlotte Brink
| colspan="3" style="background:lightgrey;"|  
| Jayne Meadows
| colspan="3" style="background:lightgrey;"|  
|-
! scope="row" | Charles James
| colspan="4" style="background:lightgrey;"|  
| Ronnie Stevens
| style="background:lightgrey;"|  
|-
! scope="row" | Chessy
| colspan="4" style="background:lightgrey;"|  
| Lisa Ann Walter
| style="background:lightgrey;"|  
|-
! scope="row" | Martin
| colspan="4" style="background:lightgrey;"|  
| Simon Kunz
| style="background:lightgrey;"|  
|-
! scope="row" | Meredith Blake
| colspan="4" style="background:lightgrey;"|  
| Elaine Hendrix
| style="background:lightgrey;"|  
|-
! scope="row" | Les Blake
| colspan="4" style="background:lightgrey;"|  
| J. Patrick McCormack
| style="background:lightgrey;"|  
|-
|}

Additional crew and production details

Reception

Box office and financial performance

 Critical and public response 

In other media
Streaming event
In May 2020, Nancy Meyeres announced a 22-year anniversary reunion event for the 1998 remake cast and crew. The anniversary event included Lindsay Lohan, Dennis Quaid, Elaine Hendrix, Lisa Ann Walter, Meyers, Charles Shyer and Simon Kunz. In July of the same year, together they discussed the making of the movie, on Katie Couric's Instagram page as a charity fundraiser for World Central Kitchen.

Documentary
Family Films Productions is developing The Legacy of The Parent Trap, a documentary film that gives a retrospective insight into developing The Parent Trap.  The film features memories and stories of various cast and crew, about the original 1961 film and its three sequels. Among the interviews, all-new footage featuring Hayley Mills is included. Additional interviewees include Tom Skerritt, Carrie Kei Heim, Creel triplets including, Monica Creel Lacy, Leanna & Joy Creel, Susan Henning, Ron Maxwell (Director of Parent Trap II, Mollie Miller (Director of Parent Trap III/Hawaiian Honeymoon), Tommy Sands, and Joanna Barnes and even Lynette Winters, and Kay Cole (camp inch scenes). Bridgette Andersen's Teresa Andersen her mother discusses reflections on experiences that occurred on-set during filming of The Parent Trap II, with director Ron Maxwell, among others including writer Stu Krieger who wrote the script for Parent Trap II. Marilyn McCoo also is featured sharing memories about recording music for Parent Trap II. Charles Fox wrote the theme, "Let's Keep What We Got" which was the title music in the opening for "The Parent Trap II", and the entire music score. He is also featured on-camera, with talking about his experiences in writing the song and music. Disney historian and authors (previous Disney employees) Bill Cotter and Lorraine Santoli are also featured on-camera. 

The project analyzes and focuses on the life of Erich Kastner who wrote the original German book, Das Doppelte Lottchen'' that the films were based on. Luke Springman, German professor Aaron Pacentine is an executive producer of the film. This is the first full-length film documentary that details coverage on the 1980s Parent Trap films, and the first time the director, Mollie Miller, has spoken out publicly about the original film since then.

References 

American film series
 
Comedy film series
Children's film series
Films about twin sisters
Disney film series
Film series introduced in 1961